Ghadames or Ghadamis  (Berber: ʕadémis; , Libyan vernacular: ɣdāməs, Latin: Cidamus, Cydamus) is an oasis Berber town in the Nalut District of the Tripolitania region in northwestern Libya.

The indigenous language of Ghadames is Ghadamès, a Berber language.

Ghadamès, known as 'the pearl of the desert', stands in an oasis. It is one of the oldest pre-Saharan cities and an outstanding example of a traditional settlement. Its domestic architecture is characterized by a vertical division of functions: the ground floor used to store supplies; then another floor for the family, overhanging covered alleys that create what is almost an underground network of passageways; and, at the top, open-air terraces reserved for the women.

Geography
Ghadames borders Illizi Province, Algeria and Tataouine Governorate, Tunisia.

The oasis has a population of around 10,000, mainly Berbers. The old part of the town, which is surrounded by a city wall, has been declared a UNESCO World Heritage site. Each of the seven clans that used to live in this part of the town had its own district, of which each had a public place where festivals could be held.

Climate
Ghadames has a hot desert climate (Köppen climate classification BWh) with long, extremely hot summers as average high temperature is around 41 °C (105.8 °F) in July, the hottest month of the year as well as short, warm winters. The town receives little precipitation throughout the year as average annual precipitation is only 33.1 mm (1.30 in).

History

Ancient eras

It has been suggested, based on archaeological evidence, that this area has been settled since the 4th millennium B.C., and is one of the oldest pre-Saharan settlements. Its situation near a water source in the middle of a desert would have made it an important spot for anyone seeking to settle in the area.

The first written records about Ghadames date from the Roman period when the settlement was known as Cydamus, from which modern Ghadames derives its name. In the 1st century BC, the Roman proconsul Lucius Cornelius Balbus invaded Cydamus during the reign of emperor Augustus. A permanent Roman garrison was established during the reign of Septimius Severus, and the emperor may have visited the settlement around AD 202. However, the Romans withdrew from the area a few decades later during the Crisis of the Third Century.

During the 6th century, a bishop lived in the oasis, after the population had been converted to Christianity by Byzantine missionaries. It became a stronghold of the Donatist heresy until its conquest by Muslim Arabs.

During the late 7th century, Ghadames was ruled by the Muslim Arabs. The population quickly converted to Islam and Ghadames played an important role as base for the Trans-Saharan trade until the 19th century.

Etymology
The etymology of the name Ghadames is very closely linked with its history. It is believed that the name Ghadames is originally connected to the name of the ancient Berber tribe of Tidamensi, a tribe from Fezzan. It is also believed that the name Tidamensi was corrupted by the invading Romans to form the name Cydamus, which in turn gave way to the name Ghadames.

1900s–present
In October 1911, shortly after the Italo-Turkish War broke out, Ghadames was occupied by Italian soldiers marching from Tripoli. However, Italy's hold on the city was interrupted several times until June 1915, when a general rising throughout Libya caused the Italian garrison to retreat from Ghadames to the stronghold of Tripoli. Effective control over the city was restored in December 1918, but rebellion throughout Fezzan kept Ghadames in a state of emergency until 1923.

In 1943, Free French forces occupied Ghadames and its surrounding area in the southern part of the former Italian colony of Libya, forming the Military Territory of Fezzan-Ghadames  until Libyan independence in 1951. Ghadames was made the territory's capital during this time.

In the 1970s, the government built new houses outside of the old part of the town. However, many inhabitants return to the old part of the town during the summer, as its architecture provides better protection against the heat.

That same time, director Moustapha Akkad chose Ghadames as a filming location for interior scenes of the city of Medina in The Message, an Islamic epic drama film.

During the Libyan Civil War, National Transitional Council forces entered the town on 30 August 2011, which had been under siege by NTC forces since the beginning of the conflict. Until 2011, the city was under control by independent Tuareg troops. After being captured by the Libyan National Army, the entire Tuareg community was forced to flee in an act of ethnic cleansing.

Old Town of Ghadames 

The old town, inscribed in 1986 as a UNESCO World Heritage site, was de-populated of its inhabitants throughout the 1990s, leaving the old buildings at risk of collapse due to a lack of maintenance. It has been listed on the List of World Heritage in Danger since 2016 among four other sites in Libya, because of damage caused by the Libyan Civil War affecting the country and the threat of further damage it poses.

Gallery

See also
 Ghadames Museum
 Ghadames Airport
 List of cities in Libya

References

Further reading
 
 Lafi (Nora) "Ghadamès cité-oasis entre empire ottoman et colonisation"" in Federico Cresti (ed.), La Libia tra Mediterraneo e mondo islamico, Giuffrè, pp. 55–70, 2006

External links

 Falling Rain Genomics, Inc.: "Ghadamis, Libya"
 Azzouz, Intisar (1980) "Ghadames, Libya" In Safran, Linda (ed) (1980) Places of Public Gathering in Islam: proceedings of seminar five in the series Architectural transformations in the Islamic world, held in Amman, Jordan, May 4–7 Aga Khan Award for Architecture, Philadelphia, ; photographs of Ghadames.

 
Populated places in Nalut District
Oases of Libya
World Heritage Sites in Libya
Tuareg
Tourism in Libya
Algeria–Libya border crossings
Libya–Tunisia border crossings
Baladiyat of Libya
Berber populated places